Goose Creek Lake is an unincorporated community and census-designated place (CDP) in St. Francois and Ste. Genevieve counties, Missouri, United States. The community is built around a lake of the same name, a reservoir impounding Goose Creek, an east-flowing tributary of Fourche Du Clos and part of the Establishment Creek watershed leading to the Mississippi River. 

The community is in the northeast part of St. Francois County and extends east into the northwest part of Ste. Genevieve County. Genevieve.

The community was first listed as a CDP prior to the 2020 census.

Demographics

References 

Census-designated places in St. Francois County, Missouri
Census-designated places in Ste. Genevieve County, Missouri
Census-designated places in Missouri